The 1965 Singapore Open, also known as the 1965 Singapore Open Badminton Championships, took place from 30 July – 1 August 1965 at the Singapore Badminton Hall in Singapore.

Venue
Singapore Badminton Hall

Final results

References 

Singapore Open (badminton)
1965 in badminton